Vagia is a small town and a former municipality in Boeotia, Greece. Since the 2011 local government reform it is part of the municipality Thebes, of which it is a municipal unit. The municipal unit has an area of 91.072 km2, the community 61.725 km2.

External links 
 Vagia
 Book in Greek: George E. Antoniou. (2016). VAGIA-KASNESI (Beotia). Athens: A.D.M. Press. . [WWW:: http://vagia-history.blogspot.gr ]
 Book in Greek:  George E. Antoniou. (2016). Boeotians in America-Through Their Societies. Athens: A.D.M. Press. .

References 

Populated places in Boeotia